Woolery Stone Company is a historic limestone quarry and manufacturing complex located at Bloomington, Monroe County, Indiana.  The property includes a variety of buildings, structures, and objects associated with the production of dimensional limestone.  These include the limestone faced International Style headquarters building, metal mill office, machine shop, blacksmith shop, limestone storage structure, limestone walls, and the grand scale all metal mill building.

It was listed on the National Register of Historic Places in 2002.

References

External links
Bloomingpedia: Woolery Stone Company

Industrial buildings and structures on the National Register of Historic Places in Indiana
International style architecture in Indiana
Industrial buildings completed in 1948
Buildings and structures in Bloomington, Indiana
National Register of Historic Places in Monroe County, Indiana
Limestone industry